The 1963 Missouri Tigers football team was an American football team that represented the University of Missouri in the Big Eight Conference (Big 8) during the 1963 NCAA University Division football season. The team compiled a 7–3 record (5–2 against Big 8 opponents), finished in third place in the Big 8, and outscored opponents by a combined total of 151 to 86. Dan Devine was the head coach for the sixth of 13 seasons. The team played its home games at Memorial Stadium in Columbia, Missouri.

The team's statistical leaders included Carl Reese with 300 rushing yards, Gary Lane with 710 passing yards, 1,010 yards of total offense, and 36 points, Jim Johnson with 198 passing yards, and Ted Saussele with 115 receiving yards.

Schedule

References

Missouri
Missouri Tigers football seasons
Missouri Tigers football